Endless Sleep Chapter 46 is the fifteenth studio album Australian blues rock band, The Black Sorrows. The album was the first of two simultaneously-released limited edition vinyl in Australia in April 2015. It was later released as a digital download and compact disc in Europe.

The band supported the European release with a 16-date tour of the UK and Scandinavia in August 2016, including six performances at Edinburgh Fringe Festival.

At the ARIA Music Awards of 2015, Endless Sleep was nominated for ARIA Award for Best Blues and Roots Album, losing to Gon' Boogaloo by C. W. Stoneking.

At the Australian Blues Music Festival, The Black Sorrows was nominated for Duo or Group of the year for theirs song "Devil in Disguise". It lost out to Greg Dodd & the Hoodoo Men's "I Wish You Would."

Background
Following on from the success of their album Certified Blue in 2014, The Black Sorrows simultaneously released two limited edition 12" vinyl LPs in time for Record Store Day on 18 April 2015. The LPs are a tribute to the lyricists. Joe Camilleri said; "I tip my hat to the spirit of these artists who have inspired me and give the songs another opportunity to be heard...I'm a disciple and it’s a bit of soul food."

The title Endless Sleep refers to the fact that the original artists of the songs are no longer alive while the 'chapter 46' refers to the number of albums lead singer Joe Camilleri has released over his career, dating back to the 1960s and including Jo Jo Zep & The Falcons, The Revelators, his solo works and The Black Sorrows.

Reception

Michael Dwyer from The Sydney Morning Herald gave the album 3 ½ out of 5, saying "The hell-for-leather boogie of J.J. Cale's 'Devil In Disguise' and Vika Bull's paint stripping tilt at Big Maybelle's 'That's A Pretty Good Love' balance the sardonic storytelling of Lou Reed's 'Dirty Boulevard' and Warren Zevon's 'Excitable Boy.'"

Dylan Stewart from The Music gave the album 3 out of 5 saying "there's a lot of fun to be had on Endless Sleep Chapter 46", calling "That's a Pretty Good Love" the highlight of the album.

Steve Creedy from The Australian gave the album 4 out of 5, saying: "As you might expect from somebody as accomplished and seasoned as Camilleri and his band, they are vividly executed and beautifully recorded. From the raw blues passion of “61 Highway” and “Done Something Wrong” to the exciting vocals of Vika Bull on “That’s Pretty Good Love” and the liquid slow boogie of Louis Jordan’s “Blue Light”, the [Black] Sorrows and guests generally nail it."

A reviewer from Daily Planet on ABC said the albums (referring to Chapters 46 and 47) are "full of beautifully judged covers of country, blues, soul, rock and jazz recordings that have continued to inspire him."

Track listing
Vinyl (HEAD210V-46)

Band members
Joe Camilleri – vocals, guitar, saxophone, harp
John McAll – keyboards, vocals 
Claude Carranza – guitar, vocals 
Mark Gray – bass, vocals
Angus Burchall – drums

Release history

References

The Black Sorrows albums
2015 albums
Albums produced by Joe Camilleri
Covers albums